Arajadzor or Dovshanly is a village that is, de facto, in the Martakert Province of the breakaway Republic of Artsakh; de jure, it is in the Kalbajar District of Azerbaijan, in the disputed region of Nagorno-Karabakh. The village has an ethnic Armenian-majority population, and also had an Armenian majority in 1989.

History 
During the Soviet period, the village was part of the Mardakert District of the Nagorno-Karabakh Autonomous Oblast.

Historical heritage sites 
Historical heritage sites in and around the village include tombs from the 2nd–1st millennia BCE, a 12th/13th-century khachkar, the 12th/13th-century fortress of Tsiranakar, the Harva Church built in 1249, and the church of Surb Astvatsatsin built in 1668.

Economy and culture 
The population is mainly engaged in agriculture and animal husbandry. As of 2015, the village has a municipal building, a secondary school, a kindergarten, and a medical centre.

Demographics 
The village had 741 inhabitants in 2005, and 787 inhabitants in 2015.

References

External links 
 

Populated places in Martakert Province
Populated places in Kalbajar District